The  (KBBI) is the official dictionary of the Indonesian language compiled by Language Development and Fostering Agency and published by Balai Pustaka. This dictionary is the primary reference for the standard Indonesian language because it is the most complete and accurate Indonesian dictionary ever published by publishers who have patent rights from the government of the Republic of Indonesia under the auspices of the Indonesian Ministry of Education, Culture, Research, and Technology. It is also considered canonical to measure which words have been formally incorporated into Indonesian.

Publication History

First Edition 
The first modern KBBI dictionary was published during the 5th Indonesian Language Congress on 28 October 1988. The first edition contains approximately 62,000 entries. The dictionary was compiled by a team led by the Head of the Language Center, Anton M. Moeliono, with chief editors Sri Sukesi Adiwimarta and Adi Sunaryo.

Second Edition 
Although many praised the first issue of the KBBI, it was not without criticism. In response to fulfil for criticism, a second edition was released immediately.The second edition was compiled under the leadership of Lukman Ali with Chief Editor Harimurti Kridalaksana with about 72,000 entries and was published in 1991.

Third Edition 
The rapid development of Indonesian vocabulary has pushed the government to document new vocabularies and update the previous edition of the dictionary. Therefore, the then Head of the Language Center, who also acted as Editor-in-Chief, Hasan Alwi, decided to publish the Third Edition in 2000, containing about 78,000 entries.

Fourth Edition and Forward 
Then it followed by the fourth edition in 2008 with more than 90,000 entries under the monitor of Dendy Sugono. The latest edition was published in 2016 and launched by the former minister of the Ministry of Education and Culture of Indonesia, Muhadjir Effendy, with around 112,000 entries. Unlike the previous editions, the fifth edition is published in three forms: print, offline (iOS and Android applications), and online (kbbi.kemdikbud.go.id). Online access allows anybody to find the meaning and propose new vocabularies conveniently. The latest online dictionary also provides the etymology of some indonesian lexicons.

Editorial Practices 
The language it records is formal; it omits words that are considered slang or foreign, and its aim is prescriptive. The authors note that "the compilation of a dictionary constitutes an effort of language codification which becomes part of standardization of a language. Continual work is done towards future versions, to ensure the dictionary remains relevant to changes in the Indonesian language, and the authors are open to criticism and advice on how the work might accurately reflect Indonesian.

Reception 
The dictionary has been criticized for being too selective, and excluding words that are in common use.  Writing in The Jakarta Post, Setiono Sugiharto states the "KBBI should be appreciated as a byproduct of work by Indonesian scholars who persistently show their commitment to the development of the Indonesian lexicon".

References

External links
Official site 
About the KBBI 

Indonesian dictionaries